Peter Playford (born 11 July 1980) is an Australian rugby union football coach and a former professional player for the Waratahs and Brumbies on the wing. Playford was head coach of the Sydney Stars team for the 2015 season of the National Rugby Championship. One of his nicknames is P² (P squared).

Early life
Peter Playford was born in Sydney. He attended St. Joseph's College and was selected for the Australian Schoolboys team.

Rugby career
Playford made his state debut for the Waratahs in 2000 against Argentina. He was selected for the Australia U-21 side in 2001, and briefly switched codes to play rugby league for the Sydney Roosters in 2002.

After spending 2003 and 2004 focusing on his economics degree at Sydney University, Playford returned to senior rugby and scored a record 29 tries for Sydney University in the 2005 Tooheys New Cup, eclipsing the previous best of 27 tries scored by Randwick's Terry Ryan in 1971. He was selected for the Waratahs’ tour of Eastern Europe before joining the Tasman Makos for their debut season in the Air New Zealand Cup in 2006. Playford was the Makos’ leading try scorer for the season, including a four-try haul in the side's 56–16 win over Northland. He joined the Brumbies in 2007 on a two season deal to play in the Super 14 competition. Playford finally returned to the Waratahs in 2009. He retired from playing rugby after the 2009 Super 14 season.

Coaching
Playford took up the position of assistant coach to Sydney University's first grade team for the 2013 season. In 2014 he was appointed as assistant coach of the Sydney Stars team for the inaugural season of the National Rugby Championship, and became head coach the following year.

References

External links

1980 births
Living people
Australian rugby union players
ACT Brumbies players
New South Wales Waratahs players
Rugby union wings
Rugby union players from Sydney